Guido Ara (28 August 1888 – 2 July 1975) was an Italian association footballer and manager who played as a midfielder.

Club career
Hailing from Vercelli in the region of Piedmont, Ara is most noted for his entire playing career at his hometown side Pro Vercelli, where he was a one club man, winning six Serie A titles; during the club's entire history they only won seven.

International career
At international level, Ara represented Italy. He was named in Italy's squad for the 1920 Summer Olympics, but did not play in any matches.

Managing career
Ara went on to manage some of the top clubs in Italy, including Pro Vercelli; he managed the club when they won their seventh and final scudetto title, meaning that Ara was at Pro Vercelli when the club won all of its seven Italian Football Championship titles. He later also coached A.C. Milan during the 1940–41 season.

Honours

Player
Pro Vercelli
Italian Football Championship: 1908, 1909, 1910–11, 1911–12, 1912–13, 1920–21

Manager
Pro Vercelli
Italian Football Championship: 1921–22

References

1888 births
1975 deaths
Italian footballers
Italy international footballers
Association football fullbacks
F.C. Pro Vercelli 1892 players
Italian football managers
Serie A managers
Como 1907 managers
ACF Fiorentina managers
A.S. Roma managers
A.C. Milan managers
Genoa C.F.C. managers
Calcio Lecco 1912 managers
People from Vercelli
Footballers from Piedmont
Sportspeople from the Province of Vercelli
Footballers at the 1920 Summer Olympics
Olympic footballers of Italy